Kirwans Bridge is a locality in north east Victoria, Australia.

On 10 Mar 2018, the bridge height restriction (previously  was arbitrarily removed by visitors crossing to the North.
 

References

External links

Towns in Victoria (Australia)
Shire of Strathbogie